ArVid (Archiver on Video) is a data backup solution using a VHS tape as a storage medium. It was very popular in Russia and the rest of the former USSR in the mid-1990s.

It was produced in Zelenograd, Russia by PO KSI.

Features 

 Using low-cost VHS tapes and recording units for data backup.
 High reliability
 Hamming code error correction
 Easy data copying between two VHS units (eliminating need of a computer for data copying)

Disadvantages 

 Inefficient tape capacity usage (only 2 grades of luminance signal spectrum were used)
 Poor software support

Operation 

A VHS recorder unit should be connected to an ArVid ISA board by a composite video cable. Unit operation is controlled by a remote control emulator using an LED.

Device may operate in two modes: low data rate at 200 KB/s and high data rate at 325 KB/s (equivalent to roughly 1.33× and 2.17× CDR recording speed). The original, lower recording speed was retained as a user option because not all VHS recorders of the time offered sufficient recording quality to reliably support the higher speed.

An E-180 video tape is able to hold 2 GB of uncompressed data at the lower rate, more than sufficient for most PC hard drives of the time. This can be shown by calculating 200 KB/s × 60 s/min × 60 min/h × 3 h = 2.06 GB (2.06 × 230 bytes), which also leaves a few minutes spare for header and synchronisation space.

Similarly, this means that an E240 4-hour tape, using the higher data rate, would be capable of storing between 4.35 and 4.46 GB (230 bytes), approximately equivalent to a standard single-layer recordable DVD.

Models 

 ArVid 1010, 100 kbyte/s, 4 kbyte RAM, was first of ArVid devices. Its production started in 1992.
 ArVid 1020, 200 kbyte/s, no RAM, was a successor to ArVid 1010 using more advanced integrated circuitry.
 ArVid 1030/1031, 200 kbyte/s, 64 kbyte RAM, had better internal design, less power consumption, was smaller in size and was made using CPLD. It allowed automatic switching to a TV set when device was not in use.
 ArVid 1051/1052, 325 kbyte/s, 128/512 kbyte RAM

References

External links

 
 ArVid description and images (in Russian)
 Drivers for linux and FreeBSD 
 
 

VHS
Computer storage devices